St. John's Episcopal Church is a historic church on Little Silver Point Road in Little Silver, Monmouth County, New Jersey, United States.

It was built in 1876 and added to the National Register of Historic Places in 1990.

References

External links
 

Churches completed in 1876
Episcopal church buildings in New Jersey
Churches on the National Register of Historic Places in New Jersey
Carpenter Gothic church buildings in New Jersey
Churches in Monmouth County, New Jersey
National Register of Historic Places in Monmouth County, New Jersey
New Jersey Register of Historic Places
19th-century Episcopal church buildings
Little Silver, New Jersey